Charles Caulfield, D.D (1804–1862) was an Anglican colonial bishop in the 19th century.

Caulfield was born in Kilkenny, son of the Reverend Hans Caulfield and Anne Rothe. He was admitted, aged 17, to Trinity College, Dublin in 1821. He was Archdeacon of the Bahamas. He was consecrated Bishop of Nassau and the Bahamas at Lambeth Palace on 1 December 1861. He died of Yellow fever at New Providence on 4 September 1862.

He married Grace St George, daughter of Sir Richard St George, 2nd Baronet, another  County  Kilkenny man, and his second wife Bridget Blakeney, daughter of Theophilus Blakeney, and had several children. Grace died in 1896.

Notes

Year of birth unknown
1862 deaths
19th-century Anglican bishops in the Caribbean
Anglican bishops of Nassau
1804 births
Alumni of Trinity College Dublin
Archdeacons of the Bahamas
People from Kilkenny (city)
Deaths from yellow fever
Irish expatriate Protestant bishops